Palhamjan (also Romanized as Palhamjān) is a village in Jennat Rudbar Rural District, in the Central District of Ramsar County, Mazandaran Province, Iran. At the 2006 census, its population was 16, in 6 families.

References 

Populated places in Ramsar County